Kreditanstalt or Creditanstalt means "financial institution" in German. It may also refer to:

Germany
 Kreditanstalt für Wiederaufbau, a German public financial institution
 , a German bank
 , a defunct German bank
 Deutsche Rentenbank-Kreditanstalt, a predecessor to Landwirtschaftliche Rentenbank

Habsburg Monarchy / Austria
 Creditanstalt, a defunct major Austrian bank
 Allgemeine Bodencreditanstalt, another defunct Austrian bank

Switzerland
 Schweizerische Kreditanstalt, German name of Credit Suisse